Andrii Abaza (1634–1703), a Ukrainian colonel in the Bratslav Regiment and leader of the Cossack formations in Right-Bank Ukraine. His father was an Abazа, Ottoman Grand Vizier and Pasha of the Ozu Eyalet Abaza Mehmet. Andrii's mother was daughter of Stanisław Koniecpolski, Polish Grand Crown Hetman.

Campaigns 
 In 1686 - 1687 participated in the joint campaign of the Polish and Cossack troops against Turkish troops in Moldova 
 Between 1691 and 1696 he led the Right-Bank Cossacks against the Tatars and the Turks at the fortresses Kizi-Kerman, Budjak, Ochakov. Close associate of Hetman Samus, Abazа together with Pavel Mikhnovych defeated Poles at Berdichev
 In 1695 defeated Tatars under the Breslov 
 During the anti-Polish rebellion between 1702 and 1704 he led Cossacks and Podolia inhabitants rebellion against Commonwealth. In late October 1702, together with Hetman Samus troops Andrii Abazа participated in the siege of Bila Tserkva, they took cities of Nemyriv, Bar and others.

He was badly wounded on 20 February 1703 and captured by the Poles. Later he was executed in Shargorod.

Family 
 father Abaza Mehmet (1576-1634), Prince Abaza Mehmet Pasha, lived during the reign of Sultan Osman II (1618-1622)
 mother - daughter of Stanisław Koniecpolski
 wife - Safta Dotsiul
 children: Simon, Anna, Ilya, Jonah

References 

Ukrainian colonels
Zaporozhian Cossacks
People executed by impalement
1703 deaths
17th-century Ukrainian people
18th-century executions
1634 births